Brian Vachon (born 10 August 1951) is a Canadian bobsledder. He competed at the 1976 Winter Olympics and the 1980 Winter Olympics.

References

1951 births
Living people
Canadian male bobsledders
Olympic bobsledders of Canada
Bobsledders at the 1976 Winter Olympics
Bobsledders at the 1980 Winter Olympics
Sportspeople from Moncton